Devon Gilfillian is an American soul singer-songwriter based in Nashville, Tennessee.

Early life
Gilfillian is originally from Morton, Pennsylvania. He began playing guitar at age 14, and while still in high school played in a band called Black Sheep.  He attended West Chester University, where he graduated with a degree in psychology, and also played in cover bands. Growing up, his father, Nelson Gilfillian, was a singer and percussionist in a local band.

Career
After moving to Nashville in 2013, Gilfillian joined a local blues cover band. In 2016, he released his debut self-titled EP, of gospel-inspired blues-rock.

His major label debut album Black Hole Rainbow was released on January 10, 2020, on Capitol Records. It was nominated for a 2021 Grammy Award for Best Engineered Album, Non-Classical. The album features production from Shawn Everett, and co-writing from Jamie Lidell. Three of the album's singles reached the Billboard Adult Alternative Songs chart: "Unchained" peaked at number 7, "Get Out and Get It" peaked at number 12, and "The Good Life" peaked at number 5.

On October 22, 2020, Gilfillian released a track-by-track cover of Marvin Gaye's 1971 album What's Going On.

Performances
Gilfillian performed at Newport Folk Festival and Montreal Jazz Fest, and at the 2018 NFL Draft in Dallas. On March 7, 2020, he made his national television debut on CBS This Morning, performing the track "The Good Life". He opened for Brothers Osborne on their 2019 tour, and Grace Potter on her 2020 US tour. He has also opened for Mavis Staples, Gladys Knight, and Michael McDonald. He performed a cover of Marvin Gaye's "Mercy Mercy Me (The Ecology)" on The Late Show with Stephen Colbert on October 23, 2020, and performed "The Good Life" on Jimmy Kimmel Live in December 2020.

Discography

Albums

EP

Singles

References 

Living people
American male singer-songwriters
Capitol Records artists
21st-century American singers
American soul singers
American soul guitarists
Singers from Nashville, Tennessee
People from Delaware County, Pennsylvania
Singer-songwriters from Pennsylvania
21st-century American male singers
Year of birth missing (living people)
Singer-songwriters from Tennessee